Grumes is a frazione of the comune of Altavalle in Trentino in the northern Italian region Trentino-Alto Adige/Südtirol, located about  northeast of Trento.

Former municipalities of Trentino